The incudomalleolar joint (more correctly called incudomallear joint) or articulatio incudomallearis is a small synovial joint between the malleus (hammer) and the incus (anvil). The joint's function is to transfer vibrations between the ossicles in the middle ear, which is perceived as sound. Contrary to other synovial joints the movement is very limited. All of the ossicles move more or less as a unit, at least at low frequencies.

When the eardrum is moved inward due to sound vibrations, transferred through the outer ear, it transmits to the handle or manubrium of the malleus which is connected to the ear drum. The head of the malleus (caput mallei) moves with it and transfers energy/movement to the corpus of the incus (corpus incudis), which is located directly behind. The sound vibrations are then transferred to the stapes (stirrup) through the incudostapedial joint.

See also

References
 

Joints of the head and neck
Ear
Joints
Human head and neck